Dave McMoyler is a sound editor who was nominated for an Academy Award during the 71st Academy Awards. He was nominated for Best Sound Editing for the film The Mask of Zorro.

He won two Emmy awards for sound editing for the miniseries Lonesome Dove and Son of the Morning Star.

Dave McMoyler is also a staff member of [Formosa Group]. He currently has over 90 credits.

References

External links

Sound editors
Living people
Date of birth missing (living people)
Emmy Award winners
Year of birth missing (living people)